The 11th Artillery Brigade was a formation of the Ukrainian Ground Forces.
The brigade's full name of the brigade was the 11th Separate Guards Artillery Kyiv Red Banner Order of Bogdan Khmelnitsky Brigade.

The brigade was the successor of the 1st Guards Cannon Artillery Kiev Red Banner Order of Bogdan Khmelnitsky Brigade, formed on 18 August 1942 in Stalingrad.

It was based in Ternopil, in western Ukraine.
The Brigade was formed on 18 August 2004 on the base of 12th Artillery Regiment of the 1st Tactical Artillery Group. Group commander Colonel Sergiy Korniychuk became Brigade's Commanding officer. The Brigade took its conscripts from the Ivano-Frankivsk, Chernivtsi, Lviv and Ternopil oblasts (provinces). The brigade was disbanded in 2013.

History
1st Cannon Artillery Brigade was created on 18 August 1943 in Stalingrad. First Brigade commander was Guards Colonel Volodymyr Kerp.

On 1 March 1943, the Brigade was awarded Guards designation for successful actions near Stalingrad. At the end of March 1943 the Brigade was relocated to the Central Front near Kursk. Between 5–12 July 1943 the Brigade took part in the Battle of Kursk. It took part in the Liberation of Oryol, Hlukhiv, Konotop and on 29 September 1943 was one of the first units to cross the Dnieper River. On 6 November 1943 the Brigade was awarded the honorable name "Kiev" for liberating the city of Kyiv.

From 14 March to 15 May 1944 the brigade took active part in the liberation of Ternopil. Later the Brigade moved toward Lviv and crossed the Ukrainian-Polish border. During the battles for the liberation of Poland, for crossing the Vistula River and a battle near Sandomierz, the Brigade was awarded the Order of the Red Banner on 19 February 1945. The Brigade provided artillery fire in the liberation of Kielce, the Oder River and the Lusatian Neisse crossings, and the attack on Dresden.

On 10 May 1945, the Brigade, being part of 5th Guards Army, liberated Prague. The Brigade was awarded the Order of Bogdan Khmelnitsky Second Class on 4 June 1945 for valour and heroism.

After the war, it became the 897th Guards Cannon Artillery Regiment.

The Brigade has been stationed in the following cities:
 Prague, Czechoslovakia - May–June 1945
 Allentsteig, Austria - June–October 1945
 Byškov, Czechoslovakia - October–November 1945
 Budapest, Hungary - November 1945 – December 1947
 Vapniarka, Vinnytsia Oblast, Ukrainian SSR - December 1947 – June 1949
 Ternopil, Ukrainian SSR (then Ukraine) - June 1949 – present
The brigade was disbanded on 31 December 2013.

Brigade Order of Battle (2004)
 Howitzer Artillery Battalion
 Anti-tank Artillery Battalion

Awards

Throughout World War II 8,270 soldiers from the Brigade were awarded Medals and Orders. 9 of them became Heroes of the Soviet Union:
Guards Captain Nikolai Posohin
Guards Captain Mikhail Zonov
Guards Captain Vladimir Strizhak
Guards Senior Lieutenant Mikhail Volk
Guards Senior Lieutenant Grigoriy Sidorov
Guards Sergeant Petr Kharkovskiy
Guards Senior Sergeant Kashagan Dzhamangaraev
Guards Senior Sergeant Grigoriy Cherniy
Guards Senior Sergeant Botabay Sadikov

References

 Ministry of Defense' Army of Ukraine magazine
Ground artillery

Military units and formations established in 2004
Military units and formations disestablished in 2013
Military units and formations awarded the Order of the Red Banner
Artillery brigades of Ukraine